Franz Zigon (born 9 March 1924) is an Austrian former water polo player who competed in the 1952 Summer Olympics. As of 2018, Zigon was still actively swimming at the age of 94.

References

1924 births
Living people
Austrian male water polo players
Olympic water polo players of Austria
Water polo players at the 1952 Summer Olympics